Aankh Micholi is a 1972 Bollywood drama film directed by Ramanna. It stars Rakesh Roshan, Bharathi in lead roles. It was a remake of Tamil movie Ooty Varai Uravu.

Cast
Rakesh Roshan as Ravi
Bharathi as Geeta
Om Prakash as Seth Ramlal
Farida Jalal
Sharad Kumar as Sunder
Meena Talpade as Suma
Jagdeep as Dr. Mangal
Purnima as Mrs. Seth Ramlal

Soundtrack

References

External links
 

1972 films
1970s Hindi-language films
1972 drama films
Films scored by Shankar–Jaikishan
Hindi-language drama films
Hindi remakes of Tamil films
Indian drama films